Diamond Lover (Chinese: 克拉恋人) is a 2015 Chinese television series starring Rain, Tiffany Tang, Luo Jin and Dilraba Dilmurat. It premiered simultaneously on Zhejiang Television and Anhui Television on July 22, 2015. The drama is a commercial success in China, with a peak rating of 1.249 and more than 3.3 billion views online.

Synopsis  
Due to her obesity, Mi Mei Li has low self-esteem, and suffers in both her work and life. One day, she meets Xiao Liang, CEO of a diamond company, and falls in love with him. However, due to circumstances, she isn't able to confess her feelings to him. A car accident then changed her fate. After a cosmetic surgery, the once obese Mei Li becomes a slim beauty and also changes her name to Mi Duo so no one from her past can recognize her.  However, after suffering setbacks in both her relationship and career, she realizes that her physical appearance is not a "free pass" to love. She is no longer bothered about how she looks, and sets her mind to become an accomplished jewelry designer. Her optimism attracts Xiao Liang, and he falls in love with her. At the same time, her good friend Lei Yiming, who has always stayed by her side, also confesses to her.

Cast

Main

Supporting

Soundtrack

Diamond Lover and Pretend are co-written and co-composed by Rain.

Ratings 

 Highest ratings are marked in red, lowest ratings are marked in blue

Awards and nominations

International broadcast

References

External links
 

Chinese romantic comedy television series
2015 Chinese television series debuts
2015 Chinese television series endings
Mandarin-language television shows
Anhui Television original programming